2-amino-4-deoxychorismate synthase (ADIC synthase, 2-amino-2-deoxyisochorismate synthase, SgcD) is an enzyme with systematic name (2S)-2-amino-4-deoxychorismate:2-oxoglutarate aminotransferase. This enzyme catalyses the following chemical reaction

 (2S)-2-amino-4-deoxychorismate + L-glutamate  chorismate + L-glutamine

This enzyme requires Mg2+. The reaction occurs in the reverse direction.

References

External links 
 

EC 2.6.1